Françoise Lefèvre (born 22 November 1942) is a French writer discovered by publisher Jean-Jacques Pauvert. She is a recipient of the Grand prix des lectrices de Elle

Biography 
Françoise Lefèvre was born 22 November 1942 in Paris. She made her debut in literature in 1974, and each of her books tells about the episodes of her life. From La Première habitude to her latest book Un album de silence (2008). Love life, sentimental life, life of wanderings sometimes, life in writing too.

Thus, Les larmes de André Hardellet (1998) relates a unique encounter between the young novelist and the poet of La Cité Montgol: on Place Desnouettes, south of the 15th arrondissement of Paris. On July 23, 1974, the sick and disenchanted poet met this young woman. The ice broke from the start. The new friends planned a visit the next day in Vincennes, home town of Hardellet. It did not take place: the poet died during the night.

Her son , whose autism she mentioned in her book Le Petit Prince Cannibale, published an account of his disease (Asperger syndrome) in 2013: L'empereur, c'est moi, at éditions de l'Iconoclaste.

Works 
1974: La Première Habitude, Grand prix des lectrices de Elle, 1975
1976: L'Or des chambres, J.-J. Pauvert,  
1977: Le Bout du compte, J.-J. Pauvert
1985: Mortel Azur,  
1990: Le Petit Prince Cannibale, Actes Sud, 
 - Prix Goncourt des lycéens, 1990
1993: Blanche, c'est moi, Actes Sud,  
1994: La Grosse, Actes Sud,  
1994: Hermine, Stock
1995: Surtout ne me dessine pas un mouton, Stock,  
1997: Un soir sans raison, Éditions du Rocher,  
1998: Consigne des minutes heureuses, Éditions du Rocher,  
1998: Les Larmes d'André Hardellet, Éditions du Rocher,  
2000: Souliers d'automne, Éditions du Rocher,  
2000: En nous des choses tues, Éditions du Rocher,  
2001: L'Offrande, Éditions du Rocher,  
2003: Alma ou la chute des feuilles, Éditions du Rocher,  
2004: Se perdre avec les ombres, Éditions du Rocher, Prix Marcel Aymé, 2005
2008: Un album de silence, Mercure de France,

Prizes 
1975: Grand prix des lectrices de Elle for La Première Habitude.
1990: Prix Goncourt des lycéens for Le Petit Prince cannibale.
2005: Prix Marcel Aymé for Se perdre avec les ombres.

Bibliography 
 Pierre Perrin, Les caresses de l'absence chez Françoise Lefèvre, Éditions du Rocher, 1998.
 Sabine Bourgois, Une autre que moi, K Éditions, 2004.
 Prix "A la découverte d'un écrivain du Nord" 2005, bestowed by the Furet du Nord bookstore and the daily La Voix du Nord.

References

External links 
 Site autour du livre Une autre que moi de Sabine Bourgois consacré aux livres de Françoise Lefèvre
 Françoise Lefèvre on Babelio
 Françoise Lefèvre, écrivaine tendre et rebelle on Save my brain
 Article about Françoise Lefèvre on Save my brain
 Hugo Horiot, autoportrait d'un ancien autiste in Le Figaro (11 April 2013)

20th-century French non-fiction writers
21st-century French non-fiction writers
French women short story writers
French short story writers
Prix Goncourt des lycéens winners
Writers from Paris
1942 births
Living people
20th-century French women writers
21st-century French women writers